The 2022–23 season is the 14th season in the history of RB Leipzig and their seventh consecutive season in the top flight. The club are participating in the Bundesliga, DFB-Pokal, DFL-Supercup and UEFA Champions League.

Players

First-team squad

Players out on loan

Transfers

In

Out

Pre-season and friendlies

Competitions

Overall record

Bundesliga

League table

Results summary

Results by round

Matches
The league fixtures were announced on 17 June 2022.

DFB-Pokal

DFL-Supercup

UEFA Champions League

Group stage

The draw for the group stage was held on 25 August 2022.

Knockout phase

Round of 16
The draw for the round of 16 was held on 7 November 2022.

Statistics

Appearances and goals 

|-
! colspan=14 style=background:#dcdcdc; text-align:center| Goalkeepers

|-
! colspan=14 style=background:#dcdcdc; text-align:center| Defenders

 

 

 
|-
! colspan=14 style=background:#dcdcdc; text-align:center| Midfielders
 

 
|-
! colspan=14 style=background:#dcdcdc; text-align:center| Forwards

|-
! colspan=14 style=background:#dcdcdc; text-align:center| Players transferred out during the season 
 

 

|-

Goalscorers

Notes

References

RB Leipzig seasons
RB Leipzig
RB Leipzig